Lemonville is a hamlet in York Region, Ontario, Canada, in the town of Whitchurch–Stouffville. The hamlet is centred at the intersection of McCowan Road and Bloomington Road, in the geographical centre of Whitchurch-Stouffville.

The town was named after George Lemon of New Jersey, who was granted land at this location in 1805. In 1877 the town reached a population of 100.

References

Communities in Whitchurch-Stouffville